Pearson is a city in Atkinson County, Georgia, United States. The population was 2,117 at the 2010 census. The city is the county seat of Atkinson County.

History
Pearson was founded in 1875 as a depot on the Brunswick and Western Railroad. It was incorporated as a town in 1890 and in 1916 as a city. The community was named after Benajah Pearson, a veteran of the Second Seminole War.

Geography
Pearson is located at  (31.298368, -82.852827).

Demographics

2020 census

As of the 2020 United States census, there were 1,821 people, 674 households, and 426 families residing in the city.

2000 census
As of the census of 2000, there were 1,805 people, 635 households, and 417 families residing in the city. The racial makeup of the city was 38.73% White, 38.45% African American, 1.05% Native American, 21.61% from other races, and 0.17% from two or more races. Hispanic or Latino of any race were 28.20% of the population.

There were 635 households, out of which 38.0% had children under the age of 18 living with them, 37.8% were married couples living together, 21.6% had a female householder with no husband present, and 34.2% were non-families. 28.8% of all households were made up of individuals, and 12.0% had someone living alone who was 65 years of age or older.  The average household size was 2.81 and the average family size was 3.43.

In the city, the population was spread out, with 31.5% under the age of 18, 14.4% from 18 to 24, 27.4% from 25 to 44, 17.6% from 45 to 64, and 9.1% who were 65 years of age or older.  The median age was 27 years. For every 100 females, there were 98.8 males.  For every 100 females age 18 and over, there were 96.2 males.

The median income for a household in the city was $22,188, and the median income for a family was $26,830. Males had a median income of $22,313 versus $15,700 for females. The per capita income for the city was $11,311.  About 23.7% of families and 30.0% of the population were below the poverty line, including 35.4% of those under age 18 and 31.5% of those age 65 or over.

Education 
Atkinson County students in K-12 grades are in the Atkinson County School District, which consists of a two elementary schools (each includes a pre-school program) and a high school. The district has 102 full-time teachers and over 1,648 students.
Pearson Elementary School
Willacoochee Elementary School
Atkinson County Middle School
Atkinson County High School

Media 
 WPNG Radio Shine 101.9

Notable people
 Tyreek Hill, NFL player, played in the 2021 Superbowl

References

External links
Salem Church historical marker

Cities in Georgia (U.S. state)
Cities in Atkinson County, Georgia
County seats in Georgia (U.S. state)